Catocala mariana is a moth of the family Erebidae first described by Rambur in 1858. It is found in Portugal and Spain.

References

External links
"Catocala mariana". Invertebrados Insectariumvirtual. With images. 

mariana
Moths described in 1858
Moths of Europe